College inline hockey most often refers to the American inline hockey competitive governance structure established by the National Collegiate Roller Hockey Association, or NCRHA, though leagues outside of the United States exist. In the NCRHA there are 5 national division, I, II, III, JuCo, and B, each having many member organizations. All divisions have championship tournaments known as the Collegiate Roller Hockey National Championships (formerly known as the National Championship Tournament).

NCRHA Structure 
The teams that play in NCRHA college inline hockey are split into divisions and then member organizations, though some teams only play locally instead of nationally.

Division I
Eastern Collegiate Roller Hockey Association
Great Plains Collegiate Inline Hockey League
Midwest Collegiate Roller Hockey League
Rocky Mountain Collegiate Roller Hockey Association
Southeastern Collegiate Roller Hockey League
Southwest Collegiate Hockey League
Western Collegiate Roller Hockey League
Division II
Eastern Collegiate Roller Hockey Association
Great Plains Collegiate Inline Hockey League
Midwest Collegiate Roller Hockey League
Rocky Mountain Collegiate Roller Hockey Association
Southeastern Collegiate Roller Hockey League
Southwest Collegiate Hockey League
Western Collegiate Roller Hockey League
Division III
Eastern Collegiate Roller Hockey Association
Midwest Collegiate Roller Hockey League
Western Collegiate Roller Hockey League
Junior College Division
Eastern Collegiate Roller Hockey Association
Great Plains Collegiate Inline Hockey League
Midwest Collegiate Roller Hockey League
Rocky Mountain Collegiate Roller Hockey Association
Southeastern Collegiate Roller Hockey League
Southwest Collegiate Hockey League
Western Collegiate Roller Hockey League
B Division
Eastern Collegiate Roller Hockey Association
Great Plains Collegiate Inline Hockey League
Midwest Collegiate Roller Hockey League
Rocky Mountain Collegiate Roller Hockey Association
Southeastern Collegiate Roller Hockey League
Southwest Collegiate Hockey League
Western Collegiate Roller Hockey League

Inline hockey in the United States
Inline hockey